Tonino Benacquista (born in Choisy-le-Roi on 1 September 1961) is a French crime fiction author, comics writer, and screenwriter. He wrote the novel Malavita (Badfellas for 2010 English translation), which was later adapted into a film by Relativity Media and EuropaCorp titled The Family; it was released on 13 September 2013 in North America.

Awards 
1992 Grand Prix de Littérature Policière for La Commedia des ratés
1998 Angoulême International Comics Festival René Goscinny award for L'Outremangeur; Grand prix des lectrices de Elle for Saga, Éditions Gallimard
2001 César Award for Best Writing for Sur mes lèvres, shared with Jacques Audiard.
2005 César Award for Best Writing – Adapted, for ''The Beat That My Heart Skipped, shared with Jacques Audiard

External links 
Tonino Benacquista fansite

1961 births
Living people
People from Choisy-le-Roi
French people of Italian descent
French male screenwriters
French screenwriters
French comics writers
French mystery writers
20th-century French novelists
20th-century French male writers
21st-century French novelists
French male novelists
21st-century French male writers